James (Jim) Ware Stauffer (6 December 1945 – 21 October 2021) known in Laguna Beach as ‘the sea lion guy’, was a lifeguard and co-founder of the Pacific Marine Mammal Center.

Stauffer rescued his first Pacific Harbor Seal pup from lungworms in 1971 and nurtured it back to health on a wet mattress in his apartment before returning it to the ocean. Later Stauffer installed kiddie pools in the backyard of his Costa Mesa home to help rescue seals and sea lions in need and the Pacific Marine Mammal Center’s predecessor, Friends of the Sea Lion, was established.

The Department of Fish and Game issued the first permit of its kind in California allowing Stauffer to temporarily house seals and sea lions at his home.

By 1976, while also a Laguna Beach lifeguard captain the city of Laguna Beach named him the head of Animal Services. The Friends of the Sea Lion created membership cards and sold T-shirts to raise money. 

The first big donation came from a woman whose dog got stuck on a cliff. Stauffer rappelled down the cliff at Three Arch Bay on a chilly night to rescue the 80-pound dog.

The woman, who wanted to remain anonymous, wrote a $10,000 check after learning about the sea lion saving.

References

1945 births
2021 deaths
Place of birth missing